Rock Camp Creek is a stream in the U.S. state of West Virginia.

Rock Camp Creek was so named for the fact Indians camped along its rocky banks.

See also
List of rivers of West Virginia

References

Rivers of Monroe County, West Virginia
Rivers of West Virginia